Hinduism and Sikhism are Indian religions. Hinduism has pre-historic origins, while Sikhism was founded in the 15th century by Guru Nanak. Both religions share many philosophical concepts such as Karma, Dharma, Mukti, Maya although both religions have different interpretation of some of these concepts. During the Mughal era, the Sikh community came to the defence of the persecuted Hindus and other non-Muslims who were being forcibly converted to Islam.

Historical links

The roots of the Sikh tradition are, states Louis Fenech, perhaps in the Sant-tradition of India whose ideology grew to become the Sikh religion. Fenech states, "Indic mythology permeates the Sikh sacred canon, the Guru Granth Sahib and the secondary canon, the Dasam Granth and adds delicate nuance and substance to the sacred symbolic universe of the Sikhs of today and of their past ancestors". However, most historians do not see evidence of Sikhism as simply an extension of the Bhakti movement.

Guru Tegh Bahadur 
During the Mughal Empire period, the Sikh and Hindu traditions believe that Sikhs helped protect Hindus from Islamic persecution, and this caused martyrdom of their Guru. The Sikh historians, for example, record that the Sikh movement was rapidly growing in northwest India, and Guru Tegh Bahadur was openly encouraging Sikhs to, "be fearless in their pursuit of just society: he who holds none in fear, nor is afraid of anyone, is acknowledged as a man of true wisdom", a statement recorded in Adi Granth 1427. While Guru Tegh Bahadur influence was rising, Aurangzeb had imposed Islamic laws, demolished Hindu schools and temples, and enforced new taxes on non-Muslims.

According to records written by his son Guru Gobind Singh, the Guru had resisted persecution, adopted and promised to protect Kashmiri Hindus. The Guru was summoned to Delhi by Aurangzeb on a pretext, but when he arrived with his colleagues, he was offered, "to abandon his faith, and convert to Islam". Guru Tegh Bahadur and his colleagues refused, he and his associates were arrested, tortured for many weeks. The Guru himself was beheaded in public.

Differences

Concept of God
Oneness of God is at the core of Hinduism but it has some pantheistic and henotheistic tendencies. Scholars state all deities are typically viewed in Hinduism as "emanations or manifestation of genderless principle called Brahman, representing the many facets of Ultimate Reality".

Description of God in Sikhism is monotheistic and rejects the concept of divine incarnation as present in Hinduism.

Idol worship

Hindus accept the worship facilitated with images or murtis (idols), particularly in Agamic traditions, such as Vaishnavism and Shaivism. Some scholars state it is incorrect to state that all Hindus worship idols and more correct to state that for some, the idol is a means to focus their thoughts, for some idols are a manifestation of spirituality that is everywhere, and for some, even a linga, a sunrise or a river or a flower serves the same purpose.

Sikhism prohibits idol worship, in accordance with mainstream Khalsa norms and the teachings of the Sikh Gurus, a position that has been accepted as orthodox.

Heaven and Hell

According to Hinduism, the soul is immortal. The souls are reborn into another being as per their karma.

Sikhs believe that heaven and hell are also both in this world where everyone reaps the fruit of karma. They refer to good and evil stages of life respectively and can be lived now and here during our life on Earth.

Pilgrimage

Hinduism considers pilgrimage as helpful for one's spiritual development. According to Karel Werner's Popular Dictionary of Hinduism, "most Hindu places of pilgrimage are associated with legendary events from the lives of various gods. Almost any place can become a focus for pilgrimage, but in most cases they are sacred cities, rivers, lakes, and mountains."

Sikhism does not recognize pilgrimage as a spiritual act i.e. worthy enough to deserve any spiritual reward.

Shrādh
Hindus offer Shrādhs every year in memory of their ancestors. On the corresponding day, the descendants invite the Brahmin and feed them in memory of their parents and grandparents, in the belief that this will give some benefit to the soul of their dead ancestors.

According to Sikhism, such food can provide benefit to the Brahmins, but the benefit can't reach the ancestors. All that can provide benefit to the deceased is his own good actions and service to humanity. As per Sikh belief, it is much better to respect one's parents while alive than offering food to Brahmins after their death.

Auspicious days
According to certain shastras of Hinduism, some moments, days and lunar dates are regarded as auspicious. On all these days special rituals are observed. It is a common practice in Hinduism to perform or avoid activities like important religious ceremonies on the basis of the quality of a particular Muhurta. One or more Muhūrtas are recommended by the Vedic scriptures when performing rituals and other ceremonies.

The Sikh Scripture, Guru Granth Sahib denounces belief in auspicious days. Sikh Gurus rejected the idea that certain days are auspicious while some others are not.

Fasting
Fasting is an important part of Hinduism and fasts are observed on many occasions. Fasts are an important aspect of Hindu ritual life, and there are many different types. In some cases, fasting simply means abstaining from certain types of foods, such as grains. Devotees fast for a variety of reasons. Some fast to honor a particular deity, and others fast to obtain a specific end.

Sikhism does not regard fasting as a spiritual act. Fasting as an austerity or as a mortification of the body by means of willful hunger is discouraged in Sikhism. Sikhism encourages temperance and moderation in food i.e. neither starve nor over-eat.

Caste system
There are four varnas within Hindu society. Within these varnas, there are also many jati. The first is the Brahmin (teacher or priest), the second is the Kshatriya (ruler or warrior), the third is the Vaishya (merchant or farmer) and the fourth is the Shudra (servant or labourer). People who are excluded from the four-fold varna system are considered untouchables and are called Dalit.

Guru Nanak preached against the caste system. Guru Gobind Singh introduced Singh and Kaur surname for Sikh males and females respectively to abolish caste-based prejudice. Although Sikh Gurus criticised the hierarchy of the caste system, one does exist in Sikh community. Some Sikh families continue to check the caste of any prospective marriage partner for their children. In addition, Sikhs of some castes tend to establish gurdwaras intended for their caste only. Members of the Ramgarhia caste, for example, identify their gurdwaras in this way (particularly those established in the United Kingdom), as do members of the Dalit caste.

Asceticism
Hinduism has exalted asceticism because of the belief that ascetics live the pure life of spiritual attainment. Sannyasa as a form of asceticism, is marked by renunciation of material desires and prejudices, represented by a state of disinterest and detachment from material life, and has the purpose of spending one's life in peaceful, love-inspired, simple spiritual life.

While Sikhism treats lust as a sin, it at the same time points out that man must share the moral responsibility by leading the life of a householder. According to Sikhism, being God-centred while being a householder is better than being an ascetic. According to Sikhism, ascetics are not on the right path.

Menstruation
Hindu traditions present varying opinions regarding Menstruation. Tantric sects consider menstrual blood to be sacred and even incorporated it into certain rituals and practices. Several texts, including Agama literature as well as the Yogashikha Upanishad, believe that menstruation is a physical reflection of the Divine Feminine, the shakti (creative/cosmic energy) that allows the creation of life. 
 
On the contrary, many strict Menstruation laws are expressed in the Manusmriti. Any touch of the menstruating woman was deemed polluted, and if she touches any food item, that was also considered forbidden. To lie down in the same bed as a menstruating woman was also not allowed. However, Manusmriti is only one among several other, approximated to be around 100, Dharmaśāstra. These Hindu theological texts have differing views on the subject of Menstruation with some recognizing menstruation as a natural process. The Vedas, the primary and most sacred Hindu texts do not put any such restrictions around Menstruation. Menstruation is a natural process and is seen as sacred as it gives life. Menstruating women in the Vedic period were relieved from their regular duties to rest and be served by their family members. They would use their free time to pray, meditate and pursue any pastimes of their choice.

Sikh scriptures acknowledge menstrual bleeding as an essential and natural process. Sikh Gurus criticized those who stigmatize a blood-stained garment as polluted. Guru Nanak questioned the legitimacy and purpose of devaluing women on the basis of their reproductive energy.

Animal sacrifice
The rituals of animal sacrifices are mentioned in some of the Hindu scriptures such as Vedas. Hindu texts dated to 1st millennium BC, initially mention meat as food, then evolve to suggestions that only meat obtained through ritual sacrifice can be eaten, thereafter evolving to the stance that one should eat no meat because it hurts animals, with verses describing the noble life as one that lives on flowers, roots and fruits alone. The late Vedic era literature (pre-500 BCE) condemns all killings of men, cattle, birds and horses, and prays to god Agni to punish those who kill.

Sikhism rejects the concept of sacrificing animals to appease God. Guru Gobind Singh prohibited consumption of any meat obtained through religious sacrifice of animals (Kutha meat). Some Nihangs and Hazoori Sikhs still do animal sacrifice.

Sutak and Patak
In Hinduism, Sutak is impurity associated with birth of a child and Patak is impurity associated with death of someone in the house.

Guru Nanak condemned such notions of pollution/impurity.

Beliefs regarding eclipse

According to Hinduism, Rahu is responsible for causing an Eclipse. During Eclipse, cooked food should not be consumed. Hindus wash off in the Ganges River (which is believed to be spiritually cleansing) directly following an eclipse to clean themselves.

Guru Nanak, when he went to Kurukshetra, asserted that Solar Eclipse is just a natural phenomenon and that bathing in the holy tank, giving alms, and so on to mitigate the effects of solar eclipse is nothing but blind faith.

Demonic possession

As per beliefs in many Hindu traditions, people can be possessed by bhuts or prets, restless and often malignant beings roughly analogous to ghosts, and to a lesser extent, demons.

Sikhs do not have a belief in demonic possession. In fact, exorcism is considered a violation of Sikh Code of Conduct.

Yajna
Yajna refers in Hinduism to any ritual done in front of a sacred fire, often with mantras. Yajna has been a Vedic tradition, described in a layer of Vedic literature called Brahmanas, as well as Yajurveda.

There is no concept of Hawans and Yagyas in the Sikh religion.

Similarities

 Both Hindus and Sikh are cremated after death
 Both believe in karma although Sikhism do not necessarily infer a metaphysical soteriology similar to Hinduism.
 Both Sikhs and Hindus revere the concept of a Guru.

In the Hindu and Sikh traditions, there is a distinction between religion and culture, and ethical decisions are grounded in both religious beliefs and cultural values. Both Hindu and Sikh ethics are primarily duty based. Traditional teachings deal with the duties of individuals and families to maintain a lifestyle conducive to physical, mental and spiritual health. These traditions share a culture and world view that includes ideas of karma and rebirth, collective versus individual identity, and a strong emphasis on spiritual purity.

The notion of dharma, karma, moksha are very important for both Hindus and Sikhs. Unlike the linear view of life, death, heaven or hell taken in Abrahamic religions, for Hindus and Sikhs believe in the concept of Saṃsāra, that is life, birth and death are repeated, for each soul, in a cycle until one reaches mukti or moksha.

Culture and intermarriage

While organically related to Hinduism, with the religious philosophy of the Gurus showing both continuity with and reaction against earlier Hindu thought, the Sikh faith is a religion in its own right, with a strong sense of its own identity throughout its existence. Some groups view Sikhism as a tradition within Hinduism along with other Dharmic faiths, even though the Sikh faith is a distinct religion. Historically, Sikhs were seen as the protectors of Hindus, among others, and were even considered by some right-wing Hindu political organizations like the RSS as the "sword arm" of Hinduism. This status as protectors of Hindus was strong enough that Punjabi Hindus would sometimes raise their eldest son as a Sikh.

Marriages between Sikhs and Hindus, particularly among Khatris, are frequent. Dogra states that there has always been inter-marriage between the Hindu Khatri and Sikh Khatri communities. William Owen Cole and Piara Singh Sambhi state that for Khatri Sikhs, intermarriage between Hindus and Sikhs of same community was preferable than other communities.

Sikh scriptures are venerated by certain Hindu communities, often by syncretic sects.

See also
 Nanakpanthi
 Udasi
 Idolatry in Sikhism
 Sikhism and Jainism
 Hinduism and Jainism
 Sikhism and Islam
 Hinduism and Islam

References

Notes

Further reading
 K.P. Agrawala: Adi Shrî Gurû Granth Sâhib kî Mahimâ (Hindi: "The greatness of the original sacred Guru scripture")
 Rajendra Singh Nirala: Ham Hindu Hain, 1989. Ham Hindu Kyon, 1990. Delhi: Voice of India.
 Kahn Singh Nabha: Hum Hindu Nahin, Singh Brothers 2011
 E. Trumpp. Adi Granth or the Holy Scripture of the Sikhs,  Munshiram Manoharlal, Delhi 1970.
 McLeod, W.H.:(ed.) Textual Sources for the Study of Sikhism.  Manchester University Press, Manchester 1984., -: Who Is a Sikh?  The Problem of Sikh Identity.  Clarendon Press, Oxford 1989.
 Harjot Oberoi, The Construction of Religious Boundaries : Culture, Identity, and Diversity in the Sikh Tradition, University Of Chicago Press 1994.
 Rajendra Singh: Sikkha Itihâsa mein Râma Janmabhûmi.
 Swarup, Ram: Hindu-Sikh Relationship.  Voice of India, Delhi 1985. -: Whither Sikhism?  Voice of India, Delhi 1991.

Sikhism
Sikhism and other religions